The Lower Rhenish Music Festival (German: Das Niederrheinische Musikfest) was one of the most important festivals of classical music, which happened every year between 1818 and 1958, with few exceptions, at Pentecost for 112 times.

History 
In the year 1817 Johann Schornstein, the musical director at Elberfeld, organized a music festival in his town, in which he was assisted by the musicians from Düsseldorf under their conductor Friedrich August Burgmüller. During this festival the idea was born by Schornstein and Burgmüller to repeat this event every year alternately between their cities. In the year 1821 the musicians from Cologne and 1825 from Aachen participated, but with the performance 1827 the responsible persons of Elberfeld decided to stop their commitment, because the town was not up to manage the rush of musicians and guests. This festival continued up to 1958 and took place 112 times. Only during the period of the Revolutions of 1848 in the German states and the First and Second World War the meeting was interrupted. After the last war in the year 1948 Cologne resigned out of this cycle of the music festival, whereas the cities Wuppertal, a fusion of Elberfeld and Barmen, and Duisburg acceded to this meeting. But in the year 1958 the festival was closed definitely, because in the meantime some other regional music festivals were founded.

At the beginning the Lower Rhenish Music Festival continued two days and from the year 1826 one day more, every year during Whitsuntide. Temporary in 1834 the king Frederick William III of Prussia interdicted this performance on Whitsun for religious reasons, but by the intercession of his nephew prince Frederick of Prussia, an art enthusiast and protector of the art societies of Düsseldorf, the festival regained permission with some restrictions.

Characteristics 
From the beginning the Lower Rhenish Music Festival apprehended as a societal and cultural culmination on a highly artistically level. To the home and foreign guests, politicians, business people and members of the high nobility there were presented all the compositions, which played a significant role at that time. In addition to the local music directors many important conductors, composers and soloists were engaged as director of the festivals. Again and again the stage was used for the performance of world and national premieres and also for the presentation of new versions by known or unknown artists. The focus comprised the music of the last epochs of the Baroque music, the Viennese classical as well as the Romantic Music and later of the 20th-century classical music. There were performed the great symphonic poems, mass, oratorios, chorale, cantatas and here and there chamber music.

This implicated that sometimes the participation of more than 500 musicians. On one side the high number of musicians and the foreign guests connoted a lucrative revenue stream but on the other side also a logistical challenge and risk for the organization.

Chronology 
The table lists the chronology of the Lower Rhenish Music Festival, compiled from a selection of reliable sources.

Literature (selection) 
 Literaturverzeichnis der Rheinischen Musikfeste in der Bibliothek des Beethovenhauses Bonn: Beethoven-Haus Bonn / literature, sheet music, audiovisual media - Short entries of query results
 Lutz Felbick: Daten der Aachener Musikgeschichte: Chronologie und Bibliographie, Stadt Aachen 1993 (html) 
 Alf, Julius: Geschichte und Bedeutung der Niederrheinischen Musikfeste in der ersten Hälfte des 19. Jh.; Nachdruck aus: Düsseldorfer Jahrbuch. 42. 1940 und 43. 1941. Düsseldorf, 1978,  
 Dohm, Rudolf: Aachens Beitrag zur Musikgeschichte; in 105. Niederrheinisches Musikfest 1950 in Wuppertal. S. 31–45.
 Programme sämtlicher in Aachen abgehaltener (Niederrheinischer) Musikfeste (von 1825 - 1879). in: Aachener Calender für das Jahr 1880. S. 107–119. und in: Musik, Theater und Kunst im Jahre 1878/79. S. 97–101.
 Sietz, Reinhold: Das 35. Rheinische Musikfest 1857 unter dem Dirigenten Franz Liszt; in: Zeitschrift des Aachener Geschichtsverein (ZAGV). 69. 1957. S. 79–110.
 Sietz, Reinhold: Das Niederrheinische Musikfest 1834 zu Aachen; in: ZAGV. 70. 1958. S. 167–191.
 Sietz, Reinhold: Die Niederrheinischen Musikfeste in Aachen in der ersten Hälfte des 19. Jh.; in: ZAGV. 72. 1960. .
 Julius Alf: Das Niederrheinische Musikfest in Wuppertal. "Moderne Musik" in Geschichte und Gegenwart; in: Beiträge zur Rheinischen Musikgeschichte, Köln/Krefeld 005, 1952
 Klaus Wolfgang Niemöller: Felix Mendelssohn Bartholdy und das Niederrheinische Musikfest 1835 in Köln; in: Beiträge zur Rheinischen Musikgeschichte, Köln/Krefeld 0625, 1952
 Ursula Eckart-Bäcker: Friedrich Nietzsche als Sänger in Köln. Berichte über das 42. Niederrheinische Musikfest 1865; in: Beiträge zur Rheinischen Musikgeschichte, Köln/Krefeld 062, 1952
 Julius Alf: Das Niederrheinische Musikfest nach 1945. Ausklang einer Jahrhundert-Tradition, in: Düsseldorfer Jahrbuch 57/58, 1980, S. 472–497
 Willibald Gurlitt: Robert Schumann und die Romantik in der Musik, 106. Niederrheinisches Musikfest in Düsseldorf, Jahrbuch 1951, S. 13–52. - Nachdruck 1966

Websites 
 DNB, Katalog der Deutschen Nationalbibliothek  
 Heimatverein Düsseldorfer Jonges e. V. 
 https://web.archive.org/web/20110719085302/http://www.staedtischermusikvereinduesseldorf.de/lebenslauf/lebenslauf_druck.php 
 Allgemeine musikalische Zeitung – Wikisource

Classical music festivals in Germany
Defunct music festivals
Music in Düsseldorf
Music in Cologne
Aachen
Culture in Wuppertal
Music festivals established in 1818
1818 establishments in Prussia
1958 disestablishments in Germany